Protein SSXT is a protein that in humans is encoded by the SS18 gene.

Function 

SS18 is a member of the human SWI/SNF chromatin remodeling complex.

Clinical significance 

SS18 is involved in a chromosomal translocation commonly found in synovial sarcoma.

Interactions 

SS18 has been shown to interact with:

 EP300, 
 MLLT10, 
 SMARCA2, and
 SMARCB1.

References

Further reading